The Hyundai i20 WRC is a World Rally Car built by Hyundai for use from the 2014 World Rally Championship. It is based on the Hyundai i20 subcompact car, and was unveiled at the 2012 Paris Motor Show. The launch of the i20 marks Hyundai's return to the World Rally Championship after a ten-year absence. The car made its first competitive appearance at the 2014 Rallye Monte Carlo.

Competition history
The cars are prepared by Hyundai's performance division, Hyundai Motorsport, from a base in Frankfurt, Germany, and were driven by Thierry Neuville, with Hayden Paddon and Dani Sordo in the 2nd and 3rd cars. A third i20 was entered in the Rally of Portugal for Sordo, In 2014 2011 Production Car World Rally Champion Hayden Paddon drove the third car in seven events during the second half of the season. Additional development work was carried out by Bryan Bouffier.

For 2015, Hyundai retained Thierry Neuville, Dani Sordo and Hayden Paddon. In addition, Dutchman Kevin Abbring was the main test driver for the new Hyundai i20 WRC.

For 2016, Hyundai re-homologated the i20 to compete with the five-door version of the model. Neuville won at Italy and scored seven podiums, finishing runner-up behind Volkswagen driver Sébastien Ogier. Paddon also won in his debut in Argentina.

For the new regulation set in 2017 the car was replaced with the Hyundai i20 Coupe WRC.

WRC victories

Complete World Rally Championship results

See also
 World Rally Car
 Citroën DS3 WRC
 Citroën C3 WRC
 Ford Fiesta RS WRC
 Mini John Cooper Works WRC
 Toyota Yaris WRC
 Volkswagen Polo R WRC

References

External links

World Rally Cars
i20 WRC